Montenegrin water polo clubs have participated in the LEN competitions since the season 1986-97. 
The first team which ever competed at the European cups was VK Primorac Kotor. Except them, in LEN competitions played also PVK Jadran Herceg Novi, VK Budva, VA Cattaro Kotor and PVK Val Prčanj.
The biggest success in the history of Montenegrin waterpolo was that of VK Primorac, who won the title in LEN Champions League 2009. Another Montenegrin holder of European trophy is VA Cattaro.
Among the titles which Montenegrin teams won in LEN competitions are:
LEN Champions League:
VK Primorac Kotor: 2009
LEN Cup:
VA Cattaro Kotor: 2010

List of matches
Below is a list of games of all Montenegrin clubs in LEN competitions.

Performances by clubs
During the overall history, five different Montenegrin clubs played in LEN competitions.

As of the end of LEN competitions 2015–16 season.

Opponents by countries
Below is the list of performances of Montenegrin clubs against opponents in LEN competitions by their countries (water polo federations).

As of the end of LEN competitions 2015–16 season.

See also
 Adriatic Water polo League
 Montenegrin First League of Water Polo
 Montenegrin Second League of Water Polo
 Montenegrin Water Polo Cup

External links 
Water Polo and Swimming Federation of Montenegro

Clubs
Montenegro